Ferk may refer to:

People
  (born 1958), Austrian judge, scientist and author
 Maruša Ferk (born 1988), Slovenian alpine skier
 Matea Ferk (born 1987), Croatian alpine skier

Other
 Ferk Relief Foundation